The Standard H-2 was an early American Army reconnaissance aircraft, ordered in 1916. The H-2 was built by the Standard Aircraft Corporation, and previously known as the Sloane H-2. It was an open-cockpit three-place tractor biplane, powered by a 125 hp (90 kW) Hall-Scott A-5 engine. Only three were built.

An improved version, the H-3, with the same engine, earned an order for nine aircraft, while the Navy ordered three with floats as the H-4H.

Two Standard H-3s were sold by the US Army to Japan, where a further three were built by the Provisional Military Balloon Research Association (PMBRA) in 1917, powered by  Hall-Scott L-4 engines. They were used as trainers between May 1917 and March 1918, although they were considered dangerous.

Operators

Imperial Japanese Navy Air Service

United States Army
United States Navy

Specifications (H-3)

References
Notes

Bibliography
 Klemin, Alexander and T. H. Huff. "Course in Aerodynamics and Airplane Design: Part II–Section 1". Aviation, Volume II, No. 2, 15 February 1917, pp. 91–92. (Registration required).
 Donald, David, ed. Encyclopedia of World Aircraft, p. 854, "Standard aircraft". Etobicoke, Ontario: Prospero Books, 1997.
 Mikesh, Robert C. and Shorzoe Abe. Japanese Aircraft, 1910-1941. London: Putnam, 1990. .

Biplanes
1910s United States military reconnaissance aircraft
Standard Aircraft Corporation aircraft
Single-engined tractor aircraft
Aircraft first flown in 1917